Weiler is a suburban district of Rottenburg am Neckar in the administrative district of Tübingen in Baden-Württemberg (Germany).

Geography

Weiler is located 4 km (2.48 mi) southern from Rottenburg am Neckar on a plateau with an elevation from 373 to 558 m.

Extent

The area of the district is 384 hectares. Thereof fall 53.3% upon agriculturally used area, 35.5% upon forest area, 10.3% upon settlement area and roads, 0.3% upon water expanse and 0.5% upon other.

Population

Weiler has 1081 residents (31/01/08) At an area of 3.84 km² (1.5 sq mi) this corresponds to a population density of 282 people per km², or 729 per sq mi.

Faiths

Most of the population is Roman Catholic.

References

External links

 Official Webpage (German)

Rottenburg am Neckar